The Aeronca Model K Scout is an American light airplane first marketed in 1937, and was the true successor to the popular C-2/C-3 line.

Design
Powered by a dual-ignition Aeronca E-113C engine, the Model K Scout brought the Aeronca design up to modern aviation standards. Eliminating the Aeronca's traditional “bathtub” appearance, the Scout featured a strut-braced high wing with a fully enclosed cockpit seating two side-by-side.

A total of 357 Aeronca Model K Scouts were built.

Operational history
73 Model K were on the U.S. civil aircraft register in May 2009 and several examples are preserved in museums. The EAA AirVenture Museum in Oshkosh, Wisconsin has an example on display at its Pioneer Airport. N18877 is on display at the Yanks Air Museum in Chino, CA.

Variants

 Model K - with Aeronca E-113C engine
 Model KC - with Continental A-40 engine
 Model KCA - with Continental A-50 engine

Specifications

See also
Aeronca Chief family

References
Notes

Bibliography

 Simpson, Rod. Airlife's World Aircraft: The Complete Reference to Civil, Military and Light Aircraft.  Shrewsbury, UK: Airlife Publishing, 2001. .

External links

High-wing aircraft
1930s United States civil utility aircraft
Aeronca aircraft
Single-engined tractor aircraft
Aircraft first flown in 1937